USS Antigone was a Portunus-class Motor Torpedo Boat Tender in service with the United States Navy during World War II.
Authorized originally as LST-773, She was reclassified Motor Torpedo Boat Tender, and laid down the next day at Chicago Bridge & Iron Co., Seneca, IL. On 27 October 1944, she was launched, and put into reduced commission for conversion to a Motor Torpedo Boat Tender. On 5 December 1944, she was decommissioned for the conversion at Maryland Drydock Co., Baltimore, MD. 160 days later, on 14 May 1945, Antigone was put into full commission. After serving in the Asiatic-Pacific Theater for a year, Antigone was decommissioned on 27 May 1946, at San Francisco. On 10 June 1947, she was struck from the Naval Register, and sold to the Maritime Administration for final disposal on 6 February 1948 and simultaneously sold to Kaiser & Co., for scrapping.

Ship awards
American Campaign Medal
World War II Victory Medal
Asiatic-Pacific Campaign Medal

External links
http://www.ibiblio.org/hyperwar/USN/ships/AGP/AGP-16_Antigone.html
http://www.navalcovermuseum.org/restored/ANTIGONE_AGP_16.html
http://www.navsource.org/archives/09/09/0916.htm

1944 ships
Portunus-class motor torpedo boat tenders